Grammatophora may refer to:
 Grammatophora (alga), genus of algae
 Grammatophora, genus of moths, synonym of Speranza